Dobra , colloquially Dobra Szczecińska, is a village in Police County, West Pomeranian Voivodeship, in north-western Poland, close to the German border. It is the seat of the gmina (administrative district) called Gmina Dobra.

The village has a population of 950.

External links
 Jewish Community in Dobra on Virtual Shtetl

References

Villages in Police County